was a village located in Iwafune District, Niigata Prefecture, Japan.

As of 2003, the village had an estimated population of 10,228 and a density of 124.46 persons per km². The total area was 82.18 km².

On April 1, 2008, Kamihayashi, along with the towns of Arakawa and Sanpoku, and the village of Asahi (all from Iwafune District), was merged into the expanded city of Murakami.

Transportation

Railway
 JR East: Uetsu Main Line (Hirabayashi Station, Iwafunemachi Station)

Road
 Japan National Route 7
 Japan National Route 290
 Japan National Route 345

Dissolved municipalities of Niigata Prefecture
Murakami, Niigata